The Men's Giant Slalom in the 2020 FIS Alpine Skiing World Cup involved seven events, as the last two scheduled giant slaloms in the season were cancelled. 

After the retirement of Marcel Hirscher, who had won the last five season titles in giant slalom, the 2020 race in the discipline was wide open, although the focus was on the two skiers fighting for the overall title: Henrik Kristoffersen of Norway and Alexis Pinturault of France.  After Pinturault won the seventh giant slalom of the season (his third giant slalom victory in 2020; no one else had two), prior discipline leader Žan Kranjec of Slovenia dropped into fourth place, and Kristofferson (who finished third) was clinging to a six-point lead for the discipline championship over Pinturault with two races to go. 

However, first the World Cup finals scheduled for Cortina d'Ampezzo were cancelled by the COVID-19 pandemic, and then the races scheduled in Kranjska Gora were also cancelled by the pandemic. The cancellations handed the season title in giant slalom (as well as the title in slalom) to Kristoffersen without the expected showdown.

Standings 

DNS = Did Not Start
DNF1 = Did Not Finish run 1
DNQ = Did Not Qualify for run 2
DNF2 = Did Not Finish run 2

Updated at 21 March 2020 after all events.

See also
 2020 Alpine Skiing World Cup – Men's summary rankings
 2020 Alpine Skiing World Cup – Men's Overall
 2020 Alpine Skiing World Cup – Men's Downhill
 2020 Alpine Skiing World Cup – Men's Super-G
 2020 Alpine Skiing World Cup – Men's Slalom
 2020 Alpine Skiing World Cup – Men's Combined
 2020 Alpine Skiing World Cup – Men's Parallel
 World Cup scoring system

References

External links
 Alpine Skiing at FIS website

Men's Giant Slalom
FIS Alpine Ski World Cup men's giant slalom discipline titles